Marimar is a Mexican telenovela created by Inés Rodena and produced by Valentín Pimstein and Verónica Pimstein for Televisa in 1994. It is a remake of the 1977 telenovela La venganza, which is in turn based on the radionovela La indomable.

Thalía and Eduardo Capetillo star as the show's romantic leads, while Chantal Andere plays the main antagonist.

Plot
Marimar is a poor, innocent girl who lives with her grandparents in a hut on the beach at San Martin de la Costa, in Ixtapa Zihuatanejo. She falls in love with Sergio, the son of Renato Santibáñez, a wealthy ranch owner. Sergio takes an interest in Marimar due to her humble, sweet demeanor and decides to marry her to spite his father and young stepmother, Angélica. Angélica despises Marimar because of her naivete, her illiteracy, and her ignorance of societal norms, deciding to embark on a campaign to disparage and humiliate her. Angered by his stepmother's behavior, Sergio decides to leave on a short business trip to earn enough money to allow him to take Marimar somewhere where she will be safe from Angélica's abuse.

However, Sergio's departure leaves Marimar alone with no defense between her and Angélica's malice. First, Angélica turns the family and all the household staff against her. She then devises a plan to rid Marimar from the hacienda by staging a theft: she shows Marimar a bracelet lying in a puddle and tells her that she recognizes it as something that once belonged to Sergio's biological mother. She encourages Marimar to retrieve it from the mud with her teeth, and after Marimar follows Angélica's instructions and retrieves the bracelet, Angélica reports to the police that Marimar has stolen it. With Marimar being sent to prison, Angélica sends one of her servants, Nicandro, to set fire to the home of Marimar's grandparents where both of them die in the blaze that ensues. Finally, Angelica forges a letter in Sergio's name in which he tells Marimar that he never loved her and that he will divorce her. Traumatized by Angélica's wickedness, her imprisonment, the death of her grandparents, and the apparent betrayal of Sergio, the formerly good-natured Marimar becomes a woman hell-bent on revenge. Once released from jail, Marimar decides to create an entirely new life for herself. Accompanied by Padre Porres, she moves to Mexico City, where she adopts a new identity as "Bella".

Marimar's life takes an unexpected turn when she finds employment in the home of a stranger named Gustavo Aldama, a man who has been looking for his daughter, María del Mar, for many years. Gustavo and his sister Esperanza take "Bella" under their wing and teach her how to read and write, how to speak eloquently, and how to dress elegantly. Her family circle expands further when she discovers that she is pregnant with Sergio's child, in due course giving birth to a daughter, Crucita.

When Marimar's metamorphosis into a new, brilliant social butterfly is complete, Gustavo takes her to the opera, where she happens to meet her estranged husband. Still believing that Sergio betrayed her, she launches herself into her long-planned vendetta against him and the rest of the Santibañez family. Diving into her new identity as Bella Aldama, she torments Sergio in a game of erotic cat and mouse, sometimes seducing him, sometimes rejecting him. After Marimar reveals to Gustavo that she is his daughter, in the middle of an argument with Bernardo Duarte, he suffers a heart attack and later dies. Marimar inherits her father's share of a country club in Valle Encantado and moves there to manage it. In the meantime, Marimar and Sergio's relationship becomes further complicated when the local governor, Fernando Montenegro, falls in love with Marimar, while his daughter, Natalia, becomes infatuated with Sergio and begins to plot against Marimar for Sergio's affection.

Marimar's campaign against the Santibáñez family enters its final phase, in which she strips Renato and Angélica of their wealth by driving Renato deep into gambling debt while holding the deed to the Santibáñez ranch as collateral. Finally revealing herself to everyone as Marimar, she takes ownership of the ranch and renames it Hacienda los Abuelos, now ranking further above Angélica socially than Angélica ever was. Marimar exploits their fall from grace publicly to humiliate Angélica in the same way that Angélica used to humiliate her. Meanwhile, although Sergio remains in love with Marimar, he ends his marriage with her in disgust due to her actions and makes preparations to marry his childhood friend, Inocencia del Castillo. Marimar sets out to disrupt Sergio and Inocencia's lives by ruining their wedding and wielding her power and influence over Sergio.

Angélica is involved in a major traffic collision on her way to Valle Encantado and suffers fatal burns as a result. While lying on her deathbed, but still as hateful as ever, her last request is for someone to set fire to Marimar's home so that she will die in agony like Angélica. Meanwhile, Inocencia is distressed to discover that Sergio has been making repeated visits to Marimar's home. Pregnant with Sergio's baby, she collapses and is taken to the hospital. Her baby is delivered safely, but a scan conducted reveals she has a brain tumor. While awaiting surgery, she is visited by Marimar. Inocencia then makes a deal with Marimar: if she survives her operation, Marimar will have to leave Sergio and her alone; if she doesn't survive, Marimar will have to marry Sergio. Nevertheless, Marimar commits to Inocencia that she will forget about Sergio regardless of the outcome of her surgery.

Marimar then decides to enter into a relationship with an engineer, Adrián Rosales. Inocencia's tumor is successfully removed. With a new lease on life and ashamed of how she has treated Marimar, Inocencia tells her that she will no longer stand between Marimar and Sergio, as long as she can count on Sergio's support as a father to their child. Renato also expresses regret over how he has treated Marimar, and asks for forgiveness on behalf of himself and Angélica.

Padre Porres helps Sergio understand the motive behind Marimar's quest for revenge, and the couple eventually resolve the outstanding issue of the betrayal that never occurred. The story ends with Marimar and Sergio finally remarrying in the small church in San Martin de la Costa.

Cast

Film
Marimar: The Movie, a feature-length recap of the telenovela, was theatrically released by Solar Entertainment in the Philippines on October 2, 1996.

Awards and nominations

Remake 
The first ever remake, as granted by Televisa, was the 2007 Philippine version of the same title Marimar starring Marian Rivera under GMA Network. It was a huge hit around Asia at the time. In Mexico, Nathalie Lartrilleaux remade Marimar in 2013 under the title Corazón indomable and Ana Brenda Contreras and Daniel Arenas starred as the protagonists. In 2015, Philippines' GMA Network remade the Mexican telenovela for a second time, with Tom Rodriguez and Miss World 2013 winner Megan Young playing the title role.

See also
Senyora Santibañez, an Internet meme

References

External links 

 Marimar on YouTube (from the official Televisa channel).

1994 telenovelas
1994 Mexican television series debuts
1994 Mexican television series endings
Mexican telenovelas
Televisa telenovelas
Mexican television series based on Venezuelan television series
Spanish-language telenovelas